Richard Frank (b 1970) is an Anglican priest: He has been the Archdeacon of Middlesex since 2020.

Frank was educated at Keble College, Oxford and ordained deacon in 1999, and priest in 2000. After a curacy in Chelmsford he was at All Souls Twickenham from 2005 until his appointment as an Archdeacon. He was also Area Dean of Hounslow from 2015 to 2020.

References

1970 births
Alumni of Keble College, Oxford
Archdeacons of Middlesex
Living people